Acraea calida is a butterfly in the family Nymphalidae. It is found on Madagascar. The habitat consists of forest margins, grassland and anthropogenic environments.

Description
Very similar to Acraea zitja qv. for diagnosis

Taxonomy
It is a member of the Acraea rahira species group-   but see also Pierre & Bernaud, 2014

References

External links

Images representing  Acraea calida at Bold

Butterflies described in 1878
calida
Endemic fauna of Madagascar
Butterflies of Africa
Taxa named by Arthur Gardiner Butler